Maerua racemulosa is a species of plant in the Capparaceae family, which is almost endemic to South Africa's coastal regions, where it is a constituent of shady forest understory and valley bushveld. They are shrubs or small trees, with mostly simple leaves, and entire margins. They flower profusely in mid-winter. Each flower bears numerous white filaments and a purple style, but no petals. The round fruit appear from August to October. These are yellow when ripe and 1 cm in diameter. It is a food plant for some species of Colotis butterfly.

References

racemulosa
Trees of Africa
Flora of Southern Africa